Gus Harrington (born 1943) is an Irish former Gaelic footballer who played as a right wing-back at senior level for the Cork county team.

Born in Togher, Cork, Harrington first played competitive football in his youth. He arrived on the inter-county scene at the age of seventeen when he first linked up with the Cork minor team, before later joining the under-21 side. He made his senior debut during the 1964 championship. Harrington had a brief inter-county career and won one Munster medal as a non-playing substitute.

At club level Harrington played with St Finbarr's.

Throughout his inter-county career, Harrington made just two championship appearances for Cork. His retirement came following the conclusion of the 1966 championship.

Honours
Cork
Munster Senior Football Championship (1): 1966 (sub)
Munster Under-21 Football Championship (1): 1963
All-Ireland Minor Football Championship (1): 1961
Munster Minor Football Championship (2): 1960, 1961

References

1943 births
Living people
Cork inter-county Gaelic footballers
St Finbarr's Gaelic footballers